Park the Van Records is an American record label and management company from New Orleans, Louisiana that was formed in 2004 by Christopher Watson to release music by the band, Dr. Dog. After Hurricane Katrina, the office was moved to Schwenksville, Pennsylvania, then back to New Orleans in 2008, where the label discovered and signed Generationals. In late 2010 the label expanded services to represent independent musicians as managers, adding artists like Broncho, Scott H. Biram, and Pigeon John. In 2012 Watson left Park the Van and the label was run by co-founder Zach Fischel, Jeff Olson, and Corey Watson in Santa Monica, California. In 2017, Chris Watson returned to Park The Van, alongside Zach Fischel, Jeff Olson, and Phil Jones. The offices are split between Sacramento, Long Beach, California and London, UK.

Label roster
Best Move
Boyo
BRONCHO
Capitol Years
Carter Tanton
Cayucas
Chief Cleoptra
Deleted Scenes
Drew Citron
Drugs 
Dr. Dog
Dustin Lovelis
Frank Jordan
The High Strung
Eagle Winged Palace
Emily Edrosa
Empress Hotel
Floating Action
Generationals
Giant Cloud
Golden Boots
Honyock
Imaginary Tricks
Johnny Aries
Lampland
Mae Powell
Mediocre Cafe
minihorse
Nari
National Eye
Native America
Neighbor Lady
Night Palace
Nik Freitas 
Oh, Rose 
Okey Dokey
The Peekers
Pepi Ginsberg
Petite Amie 
Mae Powell
R. Stevie Moore
Seth Kauffman
 Steven Bamidele
The Magic Numbers 
The Spinto Band
The Teeth
Tino Drima 
Tulsa

Management roster
Dreamgirl
Lindsey Bitson
Pigeon John
The Magic Numbers
La Luz (band)
Yumi Zouma
So Much Light
Hot Flash Heat Wave
Yeasayer
Anand Wilder
Tino Drima
Ailbhe Reddy
Nia Wyn
Steven Bamidele

See also
 List of record labels

References

External links
 Official site

American independent record labels
Indie rock record labels
Rock record labels
Record labels established in 2004